Nutaarmiut may refer to the following areas in Greenland:

Islands 
 Nutaarmiut Island, the largest island of Upernavik Archipelago in northwestern Greenland
 Nutaarmiut Island (Tasiusaq Bay), an island of Upernavik Archipelago in northwestern Greenland

Settlement 
 Nutaarmiut, a settlement on Nutaarmiut Island in Tasiusaq Bay, Upernavik Archipelago, in northwestern Greenland